The Minister of Defence of the Russian Federation is the minister responsible for the Russian Armed Forces.
Marshal of Aviation Yevgeny Shaposhnikov was the last Minister of Defence of the Soviet Union. General Colonel Konstantin Kobets supported then President of the Russian Soviet Federative Socialist Republic Boris Yeltsin during the August coup of 1991. From 19 August until 9 September 1991, Konstantin Kobets was Defense Minister of the RSFSR, though there was no ministry. This post was then abolished.

The first Minister of Defence of the Russian Federation was Boris Yeltsin, who appointed himself to the position by a decree of mid March 1992.

List of Ministers of Defence

Former First Deputy Ministers of Defence
 Andrei Kokoshin (3 April 1992 – 25 January 1996); (25 January 1996 – 28 August 1997), State Secretary
 Pavel Grachyov (3 April 1992 – 18 May 1992)
 Viktor Dubynin (10 June 1992 – 22 November 1992), Chief of the General Staff of the Armed Forces
 Mikhail Kolesnikov (23 December 1992 – 18 October 1996), Chief of the General Staff of the Armed Forces
 Viktor Samsonov (18 October 1996 – 22 May 1997), Chief of the General Staff of the Armed Forces
 Anatoly Kvashnin (23 May 1997 – 19 June 1997), Acting Chief of the General Staff of the Armed Forces; (19 June 1997 – 19 July 2004), Chief of the General Staff of the Armed Forces
 Nikolai Mikhailov (11 September 1997 – 28 March 2000), State Secretary
 Vladimir Matyukhin (11 March 2003 – 21 May 2004)
 Yury Baluyevsky (19 July 2004 – 3 June 2008), Chief of the General Staff of the Armed Forces
 Aleksandr Belousov (19 July 2004 – 25 September 2007)
 Aleksandr Kolmakov (25 September 2007 – 21 June 2010)
 Nikolai Makarov (3 June 2008 – 9 November 2012), Chief of the General Staff of the Armed Forces
 Vladimir Popovkin (21 June 2010 – 29 April 2011)
 Aleksandr Sukhorukov (1 September 2011 – 9 November 2012)
 Arkady Bakhin (9 November 2012 – 17 November 2015)

Former Deputy Ministers of Defence
 Georgy Kondratyev (10 June 1992 – 9 February 1995)
 Valery Mironov (10 June 1992 – 9 February 1995)
 Vladimir Toporov (10 June 1992 – 28 March 2001)
 Boris Gromov (24 June 1992 – 16 March 1995)
 Konstantin Kobets (?? June 1993 – 18 May 1997), Chief Military Inspector of the Armed Forces of the Russian Federation
 Matvei Burlakov (23 August 1994 – 9 February 1995)
 Anatoly Solomatin (9 February 1995 – ?? April 1997), Chief of Construction and Quartering of Troops
 Vladimir Churanov (17 January 1995 – 16 June 1997), Chief of Logistics of the Armed Forces of the Russian Federation
 Aleksandr Kosovan (?? April 1997 – 6 March 2003), Chief of Construction and Quartering of Troops
 Vladimir Isakov (30 June 1997 – 2 December 2008), Chief of Logistics of the Armed Forces of the Russian Federation
 Mikhail Dmitriyev (13 November 2000 – 8 April 2004)
 Aleksei Moskovsky (28 March 2001 – 19 April 2007), Chief of Armament of the Armed Forces of the Russian Federation
 Igor Puzanov (28 March 2001 – 18 October 2004), State Secretary
 Lyubov Kudelina (28 March 2001 – 18 October 2004), Chief of the Main Financial-Economic Administration of the Ministry of Defence of the Russian Federation and Deputy Minister of Defence of the Russian Federation for Financial-Economic Work; (1 September 2007 – 14 April 2009), Deputy Minister of Defence of the Russian Federation for Financial-Economic Work
 Nikolai Kormiltsev (28 April 2001 – 29 September 2004), Commander-in-chief of the Land Force
 Anatoly Grebenyuk (4 March 2003 – 18 October 2004), Chief of Construction and Quartering of Troops
 Nikolai Makarov (19 April 2007 – 3 June 2008), Chief of Armament of the Armed Forces of the Russian Federation
 Oleg Eskin (19 November 2007 – 20 November 2008)
 Vladimir Popovkin (?? July 2008 – 21 June 2010), Chief of Armament of the Armed Forces of the Russian Federation
 Vladimir Filippov (17 September 2008 – 12 January 2010), Chief of Quartering and Accommodation
 Dmitry Chushkin (20 November 2008 – 15 November 2012)
 Dmitry Bulgakov (2 December 2008 – 27 July 2010), Chief of Logistics of the Armed Forces of the Russian Federation
 Vera Chistova (14 April 2009 – 4 November 2010), Deputy Minister of Defence of the Russian Federation for Financial-Economic Work
 Grigory Naginsky (12 January 2010 – 6 July 2010), Chief of Quartering and Accommodation; (6 July 2010 – 22 April 2011)
 Mikhail Mokretsov (27 July 2010 – 5 July 2011), Chief of Staff of the Minister of Defence of the Russian Federation; (5 July 2011 – 10 December 2011)
 Yelena Kozlova (25 June 2012 – 15 November 2012)
 Oleg Ostapenko (9 November 2012 – 9 October 2013)
 Ruslan Tsalikov (15 November 2012 – 24 December 2015)
 Aleksei Dyumin (24 December 2015 – 2 February 2016)
 Anatoly Antonov (2 February 2011 – 29 December 2016)
 Yury Borisov (15 November 2012 – 18 May 2018)

See also
 Ministry of Defence (Russia)

References

External links

  

Defence Minister
Defence ministers of Russia
Military of Russia
Russian and Soviet military-related lists